Erol Bulut (born 30 January 1975) is a football manager and former player who most recently managed Süper Lig club Gaziantep.

As a player, he won two Greek League Championships (2005–06, 2006–07) and one Greek Cup (2005–06) with Olympiacos and one Turkish League Championship with Fenerbahçe in the 1995–96 season. Born in Germany, he represented Turkey at under-21 international level.

Football career

Club
Apart from Olympiacos, Bulut played in Greece for Panionios F.C. as well.

Bulut was released by Olympiacos in early 2007 and then joined FC Metalurh Donetsk. In August 2007, Bulut was on trial at English Championship club Stoke City having previously spent time on trial at Rangers and Newcastle United earlier in the year. In January 2012, he moved to Veria FC.

Futsal
Bulut played futsal and became a member of the Turkey national futsal team in the UEFA Futsal Championship.

Managerial statistics

Honours

Player honours
Fenerbahçe
Süper Lig 
Winners: 1995–96
Atatürk Cup  
Winners: 1998
Olympiacos
Super League 
Winners: 2005–06, 2006–07
Greek Football Cup 
Winners: 2005–06
Olympiacos Volos
Football League Greece  
Winners: 2009–10

Managerial honours
Alanyaspor
Turkish Cup  
Runner-up: 2019–20

References

External links
 
 
 

1975 births
Living people
People from Bad Schwalbach
Sportspeople from Darmstadt (region)
Turkish footballers
Turkey under-21 international footballers
Turkish men's futsal players
German footballers
German people of Turkish descent
Citizens of Turkey through descent
Eintracht Frankfurt players
Eintracht Frankfurt II players
TSV 1860 Munich players
Fenerbahçe S.K. footballers
Panionios F.C. players
Olympiacos F.C. players
Olympiacos Volos F.C. players
FC Metalurh Donetsk players
Trabzonspor footballers
Bursaspor footballers
Adanaspor footballers
Süper Lig players
Ukrainian Premier League players
Super League Greece players
Bundesliga players
2. Bundesliga players
Turkish expatriate footballers
German expatriate footballers
Expatriate footballers in Ukraine
Expatriate footballers in Greece
Turkish expatriate sportspeople in Ukraine
Turkish expatriate sportspeople in Greece
German expatriate sportspeople in Ukraine
German expatriate sportspeople in Greece
Veria F.C. players
Association football defenders
Turkish football managers
German football managers
Süper Lig managers
Yeni Malatyaspor managers
Footballers from Hesse
Alanyaspor managers
Fenerbahçe football managers
Gaziantep F.K. managers